The 1988–89 Biathlon World Cup was a multi-race tournament over a season of biathlon, organised by the UIPMB (Union Internationale de Pentathlon Moderne et Biathlon). The season started on 15 December 1988 in Albertville, France, and ended on 19 March 1989 in Steinkjer, Norway. It was the 12th season of the Biathlon World Cup.

Calendar
Below is the World Cup calendar for the 1988–89 season.

 1989 World Championship races were not included in the 1988–89 World Cup scoring system.
 The relays were technically unofficial races as they did not count towards anything in the World Cup.

World Cup Podium

Men

Women

Men's team

Women's team

Standings: Men

Overall 

Final standings after 12 races.

Individual 

Final standings after 6 races.

Sprint 

Final standings after 6 races.

Nation 

Final standings after 15 races.

Standings: Women

Overall 

Final standings after 12 races.

Individual 

Final standings after 6 races.

Sprint 

Final standings after 6 races.

Nation 

Final standings after 15 races.

Medal table

Achievements

Men
First World Cup career victory
, 21, in his 3rd season — the WC 1 Individual in Albertville; it also was his first podium
, 21, in his 3rd season — the WC 1 Sprint in Albertville; it also was his first podium
, 25, in his 7th season — the WC 3 Individual in Ruhpolding; first podium was the 1984–85 Sprint in Antholz-Anterselva
, 22, in his 3rd season — the WC 5 Individual in Östersund; first podium was the 1988–89 Individual in Hämeenlinna

First World Cup podium
, 23, in his 4th season — no. 2 in the WC 2 Individual in Borovets
, 22, in his 3rd season — no. 3 in the WC 4 Individual in Hämeenlinna
, in his 3rd season — no. 2 in the WC 5 Sprint in Östersund

Victory in this World Cup (all-time number of victories in parentheses)
, 2 (7) first places
, 2 (2) first places
, 1 (10) first place
, 1 (10) first place
, 1 (2) first place
, 1 (2) first place
, 1 (2) first place
, 1 (1) first place
, 1 (1) first place
, 1 (1) first place

Women
Victory in this World Cup (all-time number of victories in parentheses)
 , 3 (3) first places
 , 2 (2) first places
 , 1 (1) first place
 , 1 (1) first place
 , 1 (1) first place
 , 1 (1) first place
 , 1 (1) first place
 , 1 (1) first place
 , 1 (1) first place

Retirements
The following notable biathletes retired after the 1988–89 season:

References

Biathlon World Cup
World Cup
World Cup